Higher National Diploma in Engineering (HNDE) is a public institute in Sri Lanka mainly focused on higher education. Since 1986 the Higher National Diploma in Engineering (HNDE) program has been the pioneer in producing incorporated engineers for the local and international industry. The demand in the industry for HNDE students and the knowledge to work with internationally recognized modern equipment shows the quality and the standard of the course. Compared to local universities offering engineering degrees, ours as an engineering diploma awarding institute has a lot to be proud of in terms of the curriculum, facilities and employ-ability. The course content ensures that those who complete this program are satisfactorily employed both inside Sri Lanka and abroad.

History 
In 1985 the NTTTC (National Technical Teachers Training College) and Technical education unit of the Ministry of Education conducted a survey on the workforce. It was found that the ratio of chartered engineers to middle level engineers should be 1:3. However, according to the statistics it was 1:5:20, the ratio of chartered engineers, middle-level engineers and technicians respectively and it was not fulfilling necessary industry requirements. So the authorities realized the necessity of a new Engineering course to cater to the demand of Middle-Level Engineers for Sri Lankan and international industry as well. As a proposal UK based HNDE was introduced to Sri Lanka and which It was modified with Advanced Engineering Theoretical concept and Communication skills to suit modern-day industry and the course was extended for three and one-half years duration, including its six-month in-plant training period, with the approval of the Bolton University - England and was funded by the ADB.

On 30 October 1990, the HNDE was gazetted as a parallel course to other Engineering diplomas in Sri Lanka, under the 46/90, governmental circular. After a year, on 11 December 1991, the HNDE course which was at Rathmalana NTTTC, was affiliated to the B-TEC - England under registration number 78/981.
On 15 November 1992 was a special day for the HNDE 2nd batch, with the presence of the chief guest lecturer, Mr. A.N.S Kulasinghe, the convocation was held at BMICH. 17 August 1994 was a turning point of HNDE.On that day HNDE was transferred to the ministry of labour and vocational training from the ministry of education and higher education. But again after 2 years of time on 1 May 1996. HNDE was connected with the SLIATE, which was mainly under the ministry of education & higher education.12 December 1996 was a significant day for all HNDE students. They celebrated the 10th anniversary. Distinguished guests lecturer Mr.A.N.S Kulesinghe, participated in the event to add colour to the occasion. Though the programme of the anniversary was scheduled for 7 days, the programme was terminated by 2 days of time. Anyhow students did their maximum to make the programme a success. At that time students faced so many problems as they didn’t have a building for their hostel. But on 23 May 2001, after great effort and dedication of the students, they were able to attain two buildings for their hostel.

The HNDE students were lucky enough to communicate via modern technology, as a result, the deputy minister Mr. Dinesh Gunawardana launched a website for the HNDE, (WWW.HNDESL.com) on 6 July 2004 making it a memorable day for the HNDE students. On the same day, a newly built 4 storeyed building was opened and was given to the public use.30 & 31 October 2004 was a couple of glorious days for the Mattakkuliya HNDE institute. The students were able to conduct an art festival on the theme "Mini Sengavi Soya" with the presence of the deputy minister Mr. Ranjith Siyambalapitiya and Mr. Rathna Sri Wijesingha.

When it was 2006, the HNDE had already completed 20 years of time giving out middle-level engineers. To celebrate the 20th anniversary an exhibition was organized, in parallel with the INCO exhibition of IIESL was held on 23, 24 and 25 June 2006 at the BMICH. Minister Mr.Sarath Amunugama was the chief guest on the first day."Himidiriya" a collection of short stories was presented to the educationalist Mr.Leelananda Gamachchi. By the way on 7 January 2008 HNDE students’ council erected a signboard at the entrance.

For the first time at a parliament prorogue debate all the ministers except Mr. VishwaWarnapala (who was the minister of Education & Higher Education that time) proposed that HNDE under SLIATE should be approved by the UGC. While the works went on as usual, it was discussed to modify the syllabus in 2010.

Departments
Civil Engineering
Electrical & Electronics Engineering
Mechanical Engineering
Building Services Engineering
Quantity Surveying

Courses
 Higher National Diploma in Civil Engineering
Higher National Diploma in Electrical & Electronics Engineering
Higher National Diploma in Mechanical Engineering
Higher National Diploma in Building Services Engineering
Higher National Diploma in Quantity Surveying

Institutes
Higher National Diploma In Engineering - Mattakkuliya(Colombo)
Higher National Diploma In Engineering - Labuduwa(Galle)
Higher National Diploma In Engineering - Jaffna

Prograssive Path

See also
Education in Sri Lanka
Sri Lankan universities
Advanced Technological Institute, Sri Lanka

References

Colleges in Sri Lanka
Educational institutions established in 1978
Statutory boards of Sri Lanka
1978 establishments in Sri Lanka
Engineering societies based in Sri Lanka
Engineering universities and colleges in Sri Lanka